The Alpha Phi Fraternity House-Beta Alpha Chapter is a historic fraternity house located at the University of Illinois at Urbana–Champaign in Champaign, Illinois. The university's Beta Alpha chapter of the Alpha Phi women's fraternity purchased the house, which was built in 1909 as a private residence, in 1923. The chapter was formed in 1919 and officially charted in 1922; its members were active in many campus groups and organized social functions and charitable activities. In 1937–38, architect Charles Harris of Decatur remodeled the house in the Georgian Revival style. The two-story brick building has a five-bay exterior with a central entrance; key Georgian details include raised brick quoins, pedimented dormers projecting from the gable roof, and large brick chimneys on either side.

The house was added to the National Register of Historic Places on November 15, 2005.

References

Residential buildings on the National Register of Historic Places in Illinois
Georgian Revival architecture in Illinois
Residential buildings completed in 1909
National Register of Historic Places in Champaign County, Illinois
Buildings and structures of the University of Illinois Urbana-Champaign
Fraternity and sorority houses
Buildings and structures in Champaign, Illinois